Dmytro Aleksyeyev (Ukrainian: Дмитро Алексєєв) is a Paralympic swimmer from Ukraine competing mainly in category S13 events.

Dmytro was part of the Ukrainian Paralympic games swimming team on two occasions, firstly in 2004 then again in 2008 winning a total of seven medals including four golds.  All his golds came in 2004 where he won the 50m freestyle in a new world record, the 100m breaststroke and being part of both the 4 × 100 m freestyle and medley teams that broke world records, he also finished second behind Belarusian Raman Makarau in the 100m freestyle and finished fourth in the 100m backstroke.  In the 2008 games he finished third in both the 100m backstroke and 200m individual medley and finished sixth in the 50m freestyle, eighth in the 100m freestyle and failed to make the 100m butterfly final having finished fifth in his heat.

References

External links
 

Paralympic swimmers of Ukraine
Swimmers at the 2004 Summer Paralympics
Swimmers at the 2008 Summer Paralympics
Paralympic gold medalists for Ukraine
Paralympic silver medalists for Ukraine
Paralympic bronze medalists for Ukraine
Ukrainian male backstroke swimmers
Living people
Medalists at the 2004 Summer Paralympics
Medalists at the 2008 Summer Paralympics
S13-classified Paralympic swimmers
Year of birth missing (living people)
Medalists at the World Para Swimming European Championships
Paralympic medalists in swimming
Ukrainian male freestyle swimmers
Ukrainian male medley swimmers
21st-century Ukrainian people